The Burgschleinitz Formation is a geologic formation in Austria. It preserves fossils dated to the Neogene period.

See also 
 List of fossiliferous stratigraphic units in Austria

References 

Geologic formations of Austria
Miocene Series of Europe
Neogene Austria
Burdigalian
Sandstone formations
Paleontology in Austria